Haliplus carinatus is a species of Adephagan beetle in the genus Haliplus. It was described in 1936.

References

Haliplidae
Beetles described in 1936